Bulkur is a river of the Sakha Republic in northern Russia, approximately  west of Tiksi. It is a minor left tributary of the Lena, located near where the river empties into the Laptev Sea forming a wide delta.

Course
The river has its sources in the Chekanovsky Ridge. It flows roughly northeastwards across Bulunsky District, north of the Eyekit. Finally it meets the left bank of the Lena  from its mouth.

History
In 1881 the area was visited by Swedish explorers. They described it as follows:

"Situated near the point where the Lena, after having cut its way through the Verkoyansky mountain chain, empties its gigantic masses of water through a large number of canals into the Polar Sea, this place affords a beautiful view in its wild grandeur."

See also
List of rivers of Russia

References

Rivers of the Sakha Republic